Sayany-Khakassia is a bandy club in Abakan, Russia, founded in 1980. The club was playing in the top-tier Super League in the 2012–13 season but was relegated to the second-tier Supreme League for the 2013–14 season. Until 2009 the name of the club was Sayany.

Bandy clubs in Russia
Bandy clubs established in 1980
Abakan
Sport in Khakassia